Mukesh Bhatt (born 5 June 1952) is an Indian film producer and actor who has produced several Bollywood films. He is the younger brother of Mahesh Bhatt, and also the co-owner of the production company Vishesh Films, set up in 1986. He is the uncle of Pooja Bhatt, Rahul Bhatt, Shaheen Bhatt, Emraan Hashmi and Alia Bhatt.

Personal life
Bhatt is the son of Nanabhai Bhatt (1915–1999), a Hindi film director and producer. His father was a Gujarati Brahmin and mother a Gujarati Muslim. Nanabhai's brother, Balwant Bhatt (1909–1965) was also a Hindi film director. He is married to Nilima Bhatt. Bhatt has one daughter named Sakshi and a son Vishesh; Vishesh Films was named after him. For 30 years Mukesh along with his brother Mahesh produced movies under the banner of Vishesh films. However owing to differences between the brothers, Mukesh Bhatt took over Vishesh films and in May 2021, it was publicly announced that Mahesh Bhatt was no more associated with the firm.

Career
Bhatt's first film as producer was Jurm (1990) with Vinod Khanna, however, the film was not very successful. Then he collaborated with Gulshan Kumar to produce the love story, Aashiqui (1990), starring debutantes Rahul Roy and Anu Aggarwal. The film was directed by his brother Mahesh Bhatt. The films that followed Aashiqui were all big hits. These included Dil Hai Ki Manta Nahin (1991) and Sadak (1991) released under the banner of Vishesh Films. All of these films starred Pooja Bhatt along with prominent actors like Aamir Khan and Sanjay Dutt.

Bhatt produced more films in the following years, such as, Sir (1993) starring Naseeruddin Shah, Naajayaz (1995), Criminal (1995), and Fareb (1996). The 1998 film Ghulam, was yet another success for the producer. In 1999, Sangharsh starring Preity Zinta and Akshay Kumar was successful venture for the producer, while the horror films Raaz (2002), and its sequel Raaz – The Mystery Continues (2009), both were received positively. In 2004, he introduced his nephew Emraan Hashmi on the big screen with the film Footpath, also starring Bipasha Basu. His recent ventures as producer include, Zeher (2005), Kalyug (2005), Gangster (2006), Woh Lamhe (2006), Awarapan  (2007), Jannat (2008), Tum Mile (2009) and Crook (2010). and Jannat 2 (2012). and Jannat 3 (2023). and Awarapan 2 (2023). 

He produced along with his brother Mahesh Bhatt Hamari Adhuri Kahani (2015) with Emraan Hashmi and Vidya Balan in leading roles. It is based on the love story of Bhatt's parents, Nanabhai Bhatt, Shirin Mohammad Ali and his stepmother.

Filmography 

 Aashiqui 2 (2013)
 Love Games (2016)
 Sadak 2 (2020)

Awards

 1992: Nominated, Filmfare Award for Best Movie – Dil Hai Ki Manta Nahin
 1999: Nominated, Filmfare Award for Best Movie – Ghulam
 2003: Nominated, Filmfare Award for Best Movie – Raaz
 2005: Nominated, Zee Cine Awards – Popular Award for Best Producer of the Year – Murder
 2015: Global Film Award- 8th Global Film Festival Noida-Asian Academy of Film & Television

References
https://www.thepersonality.info/2020/08/mukesh-bhatt-biography.html mukesh bhatt bio [हिंदी]

External links

 
 Mukesh Bhatt Profile and Filmography at Bollywood Hungama
 mukesh bhatt bio [हिंदी]

 mukesh bhatt bio [हिंदी]

Living people
Gujarati people
Film producers from Mumbai
Hindi film producers
1952 births
Indian film distributors
20th-century Indian businesspeople
21st-century Indian businesspeople